Little White Mountain is a mountain near the city of Kelowna, British Columbia, Canada, near the central Okanagan Valley.  It has an elevation of 2,171 meters (or 7,123 feet).
It is a significant destination for backcountry recreation, with backcountry skiing, snowshoeing and snowmobiling opportunities.

The BC parks website describes it as, "...one of the most attractive sub-alpine areas in the Okanagan and is a significant destination for backcountry recreation. The forested south slopes provide extensive hiking opportunities at the urban interface." The site goes on to say that "Little White Mountain provides backcountry skiing and snowshoeing opportunities". 

There are snowmobiling opportunities in the park. Snowmobiles can use the KVR and Little White Mountain when "snow depth precludes environmental damage."

References

Mountains of the Okanagan
Two-thousanders of British Columbia
Similkameen Division Yale Land District